A Yank in Indo-China is a 1952 American war film directed by Wallace Grissell and starring John Archer.

It was one of the few American films to be set during the First Indochina War. It was inspired by the success of A Yank in Korea (1951), also by producer Sam Katzman.

Plot
Two American flyers operating a business in Indo China become involved with communists.

Cast
John Archer as Mulvaney
Douglas Dick as Clint Marshall
Jean Willes as Cleo
Maura Murphy as Ellen Philips
Hayward Soo Hoo as Jake

References

External links

1952 films
First Indochina War films
Columbia Pictures films
American war films
1950s war films
Films directed by Wallace Grissell
American black-and-white films
1950s English-language films
1950s American films